The list of ship launches in 1680 includes a chronological list of some ships launched in 1680.


References

1680
Ship launches